The William C Daldy is a historic steam engine tugboat operating on the Waitematā Harbour, in Auckland, New Zealand. Named after William Crush Daldy, an Auckland politician, she was built in 1935 and is still kept up as an active vessel by an enthusiast preservation society which charters her out for functions and cruises.

History 
The tug was built in 1935 by Lobnitz & Company in Renfrew, Scotland for the Auckland Harbour Board. She has a bollard pull of about 17 tons, and is fired by two coal-burning boilers, making her one of the strongest such tugs still afloat today.

One of her finest moments was in 1958, when she preserved one of the pre-assembled main sections of the Auckland Harbour Bridge (then just being constructed over the Waitematā Harbour) from being damaged or lost in a major storm. Strong winds had come up as a construction barge was floating the 1,200 ton structure section into place, and manoeuvring boats were unable to keep it under control. The William C Daldy took up station and kept up the pull for over 36 uninterrupted hours before the wind subsided, burning 40 tons of coal.

In 1977, the vessel was to be scrapped, but was instead leased in 1978 (and in 1989 purchased for $1) by an enthusiast society which has since kept her in working trim and hires her out for functions and charter cruises. The vessel is currently (2018) docked at the Viaduct in Auckland CBD, New Zealand, though it has had a number of berths around the harbour over time.

References

External links 
 The Tug William C Daldy Society Inc (official website)

Ships of New Zealand
Steam tugs
1935 ships
Culture in Auckland